Helmut Bruck (16 February 1913 – 25 August 2001) was a German pilot during World War II. He was a recipient of the Knight's Cross of the Iron Cross with Oak Leaves of Nazi Germany. During his career he flew 973 missions.

Awards and decorations
 Iron Cross (1939) 2nd Class (13 September 1939) & 1st Class (21 May 1940) 
 German Cross in Gold on 20 October 1942 as Hauptmann in the I./Sturzkampfgeschwader 77
 Knight's Cross of the Iron Cross with Oak Leaves
 Knight's Cross on 4 September 1941 as Hauptmann and Staffelkapitän in the 1./Sturzkampfgeschwader 77
 Oak Leaves on 19 February 1943 as Hauptmann and Gruppenkommandeur of the I./Sturzkampfgeschwader 77

References

Citations

Bibliography

 
 
 

1913 births
2001 deaths
People from Bolesławiec County
People from the Province of Silesia
Luftwaffe pilots
German World War II pilots
Recipients of the Gold German Cross
Recipients of the Knight's Cross of the Iron Cross with Oak Leaves
German prisoners of war in World War II